Luther High School South was a private Lutheran high school in the Ashburn neighborhood of Chicago, Illinois, near the village of Evergreen Park. From 2009 to 2010, the school was named Luther South Math, Science, and Performing Arts High School, with the name, the focus, and the primary source of funding for the school changed after several years of difficult financial situations. The name was changed again following that school year. As a result of a significant drop in student enrollment, the school closed in June 2014.

Notable alumni
 Common, rapper and actor
 Mike Conley, Sr., Olympic triple jump gold medalist
 Steve Conley, former NFL linebacker
 Jabari "Naladge" Evans, rapper
 Arny Freytag, photographer
 Kel Mitchell, actor
 Captain Sky, musician

References

Secondary schools affiliated with the Lutheran Church–Missouri Synod
Private middle schools in Chicago
Private high schools in Chicago
Defunct Lutheran schools
1951 establishments in Illinois
2014 disestablishments in Illinois
Educational institutions established in 1951
Educational institutions disestablished in 1951
Defunct Christian schools in the United States